The Pittsburgh Commercial was a morning daily newspaper published from 7 September 1863 to 14 February 1877 in Pittsburgh, Pennsylvania. It was outspokenly Republican in its political commentary. Its succession of chief editors included Thomas J. Bigham, Charles D. Brigham, and Russell Errett; poet Richard Realf was an assistant editor. The owners of the competing Pittsburgh Gazette eventually purchased the Commercial and consolidated the two papers as the Pittsburgh Commercial Gazette.

References

External links
Digitized issues at Google News Archive:
1863 – June 1864
July 1864 – 1876 

Defunct newspapers published in Pittsburgh
Publications established in 1863
Publications disestablished in 1877
1863 establishments in Pennsylvania
1877 disestablishments in Pennsylvania